Shakes Kubuitsile (born 3 February 1962) is a Botswana boxer. He competed in the men's lightweight event at the 1988 Summer Olympics.

References

External links
 

1962 births
Living people
Botswana male boxers
Olympic boxers of Botswana
Boxers at the 1988 Summer Olympics
Place of birth missing (living people)
Lightweight boxers